Zindel was a town in Asotin County, Washington.

A post office called Zindel operated from 1902 to 1912. The community was named after M. W. Zindal, an early settler.

References

Ghost towns in Washington (state)
Geography of Asotin County, Washington